Meghann Shaughnessy was the defending champion, but chose not to play that year.

Milagros Sequera won the title, defeating Aleksandra Wozniak 6–1, 6–3 in the final.

Seeds

Draw

Finals

Section 1

Section 2

References
 Results

2007 WTA Tour
Morocco Open
2007 in Moroccan tennis